The City of Norwood Payneham & St Peters is a metropolitan local government area of South Australia. It covers the inner eastern suburbs of Adelaide. It is divided into five wards: Torrens, Payneham, West Norwood/Kent Town, Kensington (each electing two councillors), and Maylands/Trinity (three councillors). The council is based at the historic Norwood Town Hall. Comprising the council is a mayor and 13 elected members, who are supported by a chief executive, as well as four general managers and approximately 175 field and inside staff.

History

It was established on 1 November 1997 with the amalgamation of the City of Kensington and Norwood, the City of Payneham and the Town of St Peters. The original wards at its inception had been East Adelaide and Hackney, Stepney and Maylands, Torrens, Payneham, Trinity, Norwood/Kent Town and Kensington.

Suburbs

Councillors

The City of Norwood Payneham & St Peters has a directly elected mayor.

See also 
 Local Government Areas of South Australia

References

External links 
Norwood Payneham St Peters website
Norwood Payneham St Peters community profile

Local government areas in Adelaide
Local government areas of South Australia